August Onorato Curley (born January 24, 1960) is a former American football linebacker who played four seasons with the Detroit Lions of the National Football League (NFL). He was drafted by the Detroit Lions in the fourth round of the 1983 NFL Draft. He played college football at the University of Southern California and attended Southwest High School in Atlanta, Georgia.

References

External links
Just Sports Stats
College stats

Living people
1960 births
Players of American football from Arkansas
American football linebackers
African-American players of American football
USC Trojans football players
Detroit Lions players
Sportspeople from Little Rock, Arkansas
21st-century African-American people
20th-century African-American sportspeople